Vind is a Danish surname meaning wind. Notable people with this surname include:

 Ditte Vind (born 1994), Danish handball player
 Jens Juel-Vind (1694–1726), Danish nobleman
 Jens Krag-Juel-Vind (1724–1776), Danish nobleman
 Marianne Vind (born 1970), Danish politician
 Nim Vind, Canadian musician
 Sophia Magdalena Krag-Juel Vind (1734–1810), Danish noble